Murmidiidae is a family of beetles in the superfamily Coccinelloidea, formerly included within the family Cerylonidae. The family contains thirty-four described species in four genera, which are found worldwide. They are typically found under the bark of recently dead trees, and are thought to be mycophagous. The species Murmidius ovalis, found worldwide, is noted as a pest of stored food.

Genera
 Botrodus Casey, 1890
 Murmidiella Jałoszyński & Ślipiński, 2022
 Murmidius Leach, 1822
 Mychocerinus Ślipiński, 1990

References

Further reading

 
 
 
 
 
 
 
 
 
 
 

Coccinelloidea
Polyphaga families